The threshold of originality is a concept in copyright law that is used to assess whether a particular work can be copyrighted. It is used to distinguish works that are sufficiently original to warrant copyright protection from those that are not. In this context, "originality" refers to "coming from someone as the originator/author" (insofar as it somehow reflects the author's personality), rather than "never having occurred or existed before" (which would amount to the protection of something new, as in patent protection).

Copyright finds its international commonality in the Berne Convention that creates the foundation of several concepts of international copyright law, however the threshold for attracting copyright is not defined. This threshold is up to each jurisdiction to determine. While works that do not meet these thresholds are not eligible for copyright protection, they may still be eligible for protection through other intellectual property laws, such as trademarks or design patents (particularly in the case of logos).

Originality in specific types of works

Pre-positioned recording devices
Security cameras, webcams, camera traps and other pre-positioned recording devices capture whatever happens to take place in their field of view. This raises the question whether their recordings are an original and therefore copyrighted work. For example, "[i]f a security camera mounted in a lobby, recording 24 hours a day, captured a dramatic event, the video could be uncopyrighted."

To date, this question remains untested in the United States. One 2008 United States district court case, Southwest Casino and Hotel Corp. vs Flyingman, would have been on point had the case ever been heard. The casino filed suit for copyright infringement on the use of their surveillance video. The defendant argued in a motion that the surveillance video lacked the sufficient creativity needed to secure copyright protection.  That argument never got its day in court; instead, the case fell apart when a separate tribal court ruled that the tribes, rather than the casino, owned the footage.

Under New Zealand law, according to Susy Frankel:

Frankel concludes that, under New Zealand law, "a security camera film may not reach the requisite originality threshold, but each case must be assessed on its facts."

In England, the topic came up in 2000, during the aftermath of the death of Diana, Princess of Wales and Dodi Fayed, when a security guard at a property owned by Dodi's father, Mohamed Al Fayed, took still-frame photographs from security video – which showed the couple in the driveway just before their deaths – and sold them to a newspaper.  Al Fayed and his privately held security company filed suit, alleging, among other things, infringement of copyright.  In that case, Hyde Park Residence Ltd v. Yelland before the Court of Appeal of England and Wales, "ownership and subsistence of copyright were not in dispute", because, "as section 1 of the 1988 Act makes clear, copyright is a property right" which was owned by the security company. Ultimately, that case concluded that copying and selling the photographs did not lead to a defence of fair dealing, nor did it serve the public interest.

In Canada, author David Vaver criticised the decision of the above court, expressing the opinion that "whether scenes taken by an automatic surveillance camera are authored by anyone is doubtful: the person responsible for positioning the camera is no Atom Egoyan. Such authorless films may have no copyright at all".

In the law of continental European countries, according to Pascal Kamina, there is "little doubt that 'works' such as security camera videos would not satisfy" the requirement of originality. Russian copyright law specifically exempts purely informational reports on events and facts from protection, and security camera footage is not considered a work of authorship. This interpretation was applied in a number of Russian legal cases.

A similar topic came up in 2011, when a representative of the Caters News Agency asked the website Techdirt to take down a photo that it had licensed from nature photographer David Slater. The image—a self-portrait taken by a wild monkey using Slater's camera, had been used to illustrate a post questioning whether Slater could even hold any copyright interest in the image. Slater argued that he had copyright interest in the photo because he had "engineered" the shot, and that "it was artistry and idea to leave them to play with the camera and it was all in my eyesight. I knew the monkeys were very likely to do this and I predicted it. I knew there was a chance of a photo being taken." Aurelia J. Schultz disputed Slater's claims, noting a monkey would be incapable of holding a copyright in Indonesia (where the photo was taken), the United Kingdom, or the United States, because it is not a legal "person". In December 2014, the United States Copyright Office issued an opinion backing the argument, stating that works by animals cannot be copyrighted, because they were not a work of authorship by a human. Nonetheless, the animal rights group PETA sued Slater on behalf of the monkey under the next friend principle.

Uses of the concept of originality by country

Australia 

Despite consisting only of two fields and a circle at the centre, the Federal Court of Australia had upheld copyright claims over the Australian Aboriginal Flag by its designer, Harold Thomas. On 24 January 2022, the Commonwealth government announced, after more than three years of confidential negotiations, Thomas had transferred the copyright to the flag to the Commonwealth. The federal government paid AUS$20.05 million to Thomas and licence holders (including WAM Clothing and Carroll and Richardson Flagworld) to extinguish existing licences and secure copyright. As part of the copyright transfer, Thomas retained moral rights over the flag (which include the right to be identified as its creator). Following the copyright transfer, Carroll and Richardson Flagworld continued to be the exclusive manufacturer, although individuals may make copies for personal use.

Canada 
Under Canadian copyright law, an eligible work must be original to its author, not copied from another work, and requires more than trivial or mechanical intellectual effort. In the case of CCH Canadian Ltd. v. Law Society of Upper Canada, the Supreme Court of Canada examined the different approaches taken to the definition of originality. The Supreme Court ultimately concluded that the proper approach in Canadian law fell between the approach of labour and diligence, and that of creativity. Chief Justice McLachlin stated that the "exercise of skill and judgment" was necessary in order for an expression to attract copyright protection. Chief Justice McLachlin went on to state that the exercise of skill and judgement would require "intellectual effort" and "must not be so trivial that it could be characterized as a purely mechanical exercise."   It has been suggested that this approach taken by the Supreme Court of Canada is functionally the same as the approach taken by the Supreme Court of the United States in Feist Publications v. Rural Telephone Service, and by some civil law courts as those courts require that a work demonstrate a "modicum of creativity" in decision making rather than a mechanical exercise in order to be original.

European Union 
The test for the threshold of originality is in the European Union whether the work is the author's own intellectual creation. This threshold for originality is harmonised within the European Union by the European Court of Justice in Infopaq International A/S v Danske Dagblades Forening case.

Germany 

In German copyright law, the "Schöpfungshöhe" (literally: height of creation) could classify copyrightable works into two classes, a design, or anything else (such as a literary work). While the threshold (which is reached even by simple creations, known as "Kleine Münze", German for "Small change") was low, the requirements for design, works that have a "purpose" (such as brand identification), was set much higher, as "novel" designs could be protected by the lex specialis law for design patents ("Geschmacksmustergesetz") or by trademark laws. Only design creations that were very high above the average were considered to be "works of applied art" and so granted copyright. As an example in case law, the logo of the German public broadcaster ARD, was considered ineligible for protection under German copyright law.

In November 2013, the Federal Court of Justice rejected the concept of a lower standard for applied artworks in the Geburtstagszug case. The court ruled that per changes made to German law in 2004 by the implementation of the Directive on the legal protection of designs, copyright and design right were two separate concepts that could co-exist in applied art, as they had different requirements; novelty and an "individual character" for design right, and "a degree of creativity which allows, from the view of a public open to art and sufficiently skilled in ideas of art, to be called an 'artistic' performance", for copyright. This makes the threshold nearly identical to that in other forms of works. The case centred around the creator of the "Birthday Train", who had received royalties from a design patent but wanted to also collect royalties on the concept as a copyrighted work.

In June 2016, a state court ruled in a complaint against the Wikimedia Foundation by the Reiss Engelhorn Museum, that digital reproductions of public domain works are subject to a new copyright.

Netherlands
A controversial decision on 16 July 2013 rendered "backseat conversations"—such as those between Willem Endstra and police—not sufficiently creative for copyright protection.

India 
Section 13(1)(a) of the Indian Copyright Act, 1957 mentions 'originality' as a requirement for copyright protection to literary, dramatic, musical and artistic works. Courts have interpreted this requirement of 'originality' in different ways. This has given rise to various doctrines/tests that can be helpful in determining whether a work meets the threshold of originality. The most prominent case with respect to 'originality' under the Indian Copyright Law is the Eastern Book Company v DCB Modak. This judgment gave rise to two doctrines i.e. modicum of creativity and the skill and judgment test. This remains the accepted and current position of law in India as of now. However, prior to this, the Indian Courts used to follow the Sweat of the Brow approach.

Sweat of the Brow theory 
This theory bases the grant of copyright protection on the effort and labour that an author puts into his or her work as opposed to the creativity involved. Locke's theory of labour as property has often been extended to give jurisprudential basis to this theory of copyright law. In the case of V. Govindan v E.M. Gopalakrishna Kone, it was held that compilations of information would meet the threshold of 'originality' under the Indian Copyright Act since it involves some level of 'skill, labour and brain'. A similar line of reasoning was adopted in the case of Burlington Home Shipping Pvt Ltd v Rajnish Chibber where a database was held to be original enough to be protected by copyright under Indian law. Like in other jurisdictions, however, this theory was discarded by the Indian Courts also and the focus was shifted to the creativity involved in any work.

EBC Modak Case (Modicum of Creativity & Skill and Judgment Test) 
The EBC Modak case is the Indian counterpart of the Feist Publications case in terms of the test it laid down. It concerned the copyrightability of Supreme Court judgments that were copy-edited and published by Eastern Book Company. These judgments were published along with 'headnotes' that were written by the Company itself. While explicitly discarding the Sweat of the Brow theory, the Court held that simply copy editing would not meet the threshold of originality under copyright law since it would only demonstrate an "amount of skill, labour and capital put in the inputs of the copy-edited judgments and the original or innovative thoughts for the creativity would be completely excluded.". Thus, it introduced the requirement of 'creativity' under originality. With respect to the level of creativity involved, the court adopted the 'minimal degree of creativity' approach. Following this standard, the headnotes that did not copy from the judgment verbatim were held to be copyrightable.

Finally, the Court also gave way to the 'Skill and Judgment Test' which is more or less a compromise between the sweat of the brow theory and the modicum of creativity test. While relying on the CCH Canadian Case, the Court essentially held that a work would meet the originality standard as long as there is labour or effort involved but not only labour. It must involve some level of skill and judgment as well. However, this approach mirrors the Sweat of the Brow theory more closely and is therefore a difficult theory to defend. Further, the Court held the division of a judgment into paragraphs and numbering them was enough to meet this standard of 'Skill and Judgment'. Whether this is the correct interpretation of the test as given in the CCH Canadian Case remains debatable.

Japan 

In Japanese copyright law, a work is considered eligible for protection when it is "a production in which thoughts or sentiments are expressed in a creative way and which falls within the literary, scientific, artistic or musical domain."

In a case law, Nissin Foods lost the case for the design of Cup Noodles packaging. Tokyo High Court ruled that although the shape is stylised, the text is in a normal arrangement and keeps its function of being read as a sequence of letters.

Japanese courts have decided that to be copyrightable, a text logo needs to have artistic appearance that is worth artistic appreciation. Logos composed merely of geometric shapes and texts are also not copyrightable in general.

Switzerland

Copyright law of Switzerland defines works as being "creations of the mind, literary or artistic, that have an individual character."
 In a 2003 decision, the Federal Supreme Court of Switzerland ruled that a photo of Bob Marley taken at a concert by a spectator with a handheld camera was eligible for protection, because it had the required individual character by virtue of the aesthetic appeal of the picture, combined with the orientation of the picture's components and the distribution of light and shadow. It also found that the photograph was a "creation of the mind" by being shot at a specific time during the singer's movement on the stage.

By contrast, in the 2004 case Blau Guggenheim v. British Broadcasting Corporation, the Court found that a photo, shot by a reporter to document Christoph Meili with the files he had taken from his employer, lacked individual character. It found that the scope of conceptual and technical possibilities was not exploited, and that the photograph did not distinguish itself in any way from what was common use.

These decisions were superseded by the insertion of Article 2 paragraph 3bis, effective 1 April 2020.  "Photographic depictions and depictions of three-dimensional objects produced by a process similar to that of photography are considered works, even if they do not have individual character."

Taiwan
In Taiwan, independently created works with "minimal creativity" are eligible for copyright protection.

United States

In United States copyright law, the principle of requiring originality for copyright protection was invoked in the 1991 ruling of the United States Supreme Court in Feist Publications v. Rural Telephone Service. The court opinion stated that copyright protection could only be granted to "works of authorship" that possess "at least some minimal degree of creativity". As such, mere labor ("sweat of the brow") is not sufficient to establish a copyright claim. For example, the expression of some obvious methods of compilation and computation, such as the Yellow Pages or blank forms, cannot receive a copyright (demonstrated in  Morrissey v. Procter & Gamble), but sufficiently original elements within the work itself can still be eligible for protection. 

The Supreme Court similarly established in Star Athletica, LLC v. Varsity Brands, Inc. that artistic elements of a practical article (such as clothing) can be copyrighted if they meet the threshold of originality, and can be identified as art when they are mentally separated from the item's practical aspects.

Reproductions
The requirement of originality was also invoked in the 1999 United States District Court case Bridgeman Art Library v. Corel Corp. In the case, Bridgeman Art Library questioned the Corel Corporation's rights to redistribute their high quality reproductions of old paintings that had already fallen into the public domain due to age, claiming that it infringed on their copyrights. The court ruled that exact or "slavish" reproductions of two-dimensional works such as paintings and photographs that were already in the public domain could not be considered original enough for protection under U.S. law, "a photograph which is no more than a copy of a work of another as exact as science and technology permits lacks originality. That is not to say that such a feat is trivial, simply not original".

Another court case related to threshold of originality was the 2008 case Meshwerks v. Toyota Motor Sales U.S. In this case, the court ruled that wire-frame computer models of Toyota vehicles were not entitled to additional copyright protection since the purpose of the models was to faithfully represent the original objects without any creative additions.

In May 2016, Judge Percy Anderson ruled that remastered versions of musical recordings are eligible to receive a new copyright if they contain "multiple kinds of creative authorship, such as adjustments of equalization, sound editing and channel assignment", that are perceptible from the original work. This applies even if the work was only subject to common law state copyright as a sound recording published prior to 1972, thus making them become eligible for compulsory licenses under federal copyright law. This was overruled in 2018 in a 3–0 ruling by the 9th Circuit Court of Appeals, which held that "A digitally remastered sound recording made as a copy of the original analog sound recording will rarely exhibit the necessary originality to qualify for independent copyright protection."

Typefaces and geometry

House Report No. 94-1476 states that the design of a typeface cannot be protected under U.S. law. The non-eligibility of "textual matter" was raised in Ets-Hokin v. Skyy Spirits Inc., judging whether photographs of bottles of SKYY vodka were original enough for protection:

Mechanically produced works
In works produced in a mechanical medium, "there is broad scope for copyright . . . because 'a very modest expression of personality will constitute originality.'" With respect to United States law, Stephen M. McJohn writes:

Difficulties arise when attempting to determine the boundary line between mechanical or random processes and instances in which the slight intervention of a human agent results in the production of a copyrightable work. The Congressional Office of Technology Assessment posited that the question is open as to whether computers are unlike other tools of creation in that they are possible of being co-creators.
The U.S. Copyright Office has taken the position that "in order to be entitled to copyright registration, a work must be the product of human authorship. Works produced by mechanical processes or random selection without any contribution by a human author are not registrable."

The "sweat of the brow" doctrine 

Some countries grant copyright protection based on how much labour and diligence it took to create a work, rather than or in addition to how original a work is. This is referred to as the "sweat of the brow" doctrine in relation to the idiom, "the sweat of one's brow".

The sweat of the brow doctrine has been recognised at various times in the United Kingdom, Canada, Australia, and elsewhere. The 1900 UK case Walter v. Lane ruled that the copyright of an account of a speech transcribed by a reporter belonged to the newspaper he worked for because of the effort it took to reproduce his spoken words.

Courts in the United States rejected this notion in Feist Publications v. Rural Telephone Service (1991) and Bridgeman Art Library v. Corel Corp. (1999). In these cases, the courts asserted that originality was required for copyright protection. Since the Feist decision, many common law countries have moved towards applying a similar standard. A similar precedent was set in Canada by cases such as Tele-Direct (Publications) Inc. v. American Business Information Inc. (1997), where the court concluded that compilations of data must embody originality and creativity in order to be copyrighted.

In March 2012, the European Court of Justice also set a similar precedent, ruling that Football DataCo could not claim copyright on association football match schedules due to the skill and labour used in their creation, as their compilation is "dictated by rules or constraints which leave no room for creative freedom". In November 2015, the United Kingdom's Intellectual Property Office clarified that it was "unlikely" that a digitised reproduction of a work out of copyright would be original enough to attain a new copyright.

See also 
Commons:Threshold of originality
 Commons:Commons:Derivative works
 Derivative works

References

Further reading
 Justin Hughes: The Philosophy of Intellectual Property in: Georgetown Law Journal, Vol. 77, 1988, pp. 6–28
 Peter Drahos: A Philosophy of Intellectual Property, Dartmouth Publishing, 1996, 
 Elizabeth F. Judge/Daniel Gervais: Of Silos and Constellations: Comparing Notions of Originality in Copyright Law, in: Cardozo Arts & Entertainment Law Journal, Vol. 27, 2009, pp. 375–408, (PDF version).
 Orit Fischman Afori: The Role of the Non-Functionality Requirement in Design Law, in: Fordham Intellectual Property, Media & Entertainment Law Journal, Vol. 20:3, 2010 pp. 847–874, (PDF version).
 Eva E. Subotnik: Originality Proxies: Toward a Theory of Copyright and Creativity., in: Brooklyn Law Review, Vol. 76:4, 2010, pp. 1552.
 Carys J. Craig: Copyright, Communication and Culture: Towards a Relational Theory of Copyright Law, Edward Elgar Publishing, .
 Estelle Derclaye: Wonderful or worrisome? The impact of the ECJ ruling in infopaq on UK Copyright law. in: EIPR Vol. 5, 2010, pp. 247-251.
 Annabelle Lever (ed.): New Frontiers in the Philosophy of Intellectual Property, Cambridge University Press, 2012,

External links 
U.S. Copyright Office: Compendium of Office Practices III. URL last accessed 2017-03-01.

Copyright law